Mohamed Derrag (born April 3, 1985 in Algiers) is an Algerian football player who plays as a forward for USM El Harrach in the Algerian Ligue 2. His main position is centre forward, and he can also play as a second striker or left winger.

Honours
 Won the Algerian League twice:
 Once with JS Kabylie in 2008
 Once with MC Alger in 2010

External links
 JS Kabylie Profile
 DZFoot Profile

1985 births
Algerian footballers
Living people
JS Kabylie players
MC Alger players
Footballers from Algiers
Algerian Ligue Professionnelle 1 players
Algeria A' international footballers
OMR El Annasser players
JSM Béjaïa players
CS Constantine players
Association football forwards
21st-century Algerian people
20th-century Algerian people